Addicted to Black is an album by singer-songwriter Don McLean, released in May 2009. It is his first album of original material in 14 years.

Track listing

Personnel
Don McLean – vocals, acoustic guitar, five-string banjo
Pat Severs – acoustic, electric, dobro and steel guitars
Mike Severs – electric and acoustic guitars, ukulele, additional drum and keyboard programming
Mark Prentice – electric bass
Hank Singer – fiddle
Jerry Kroon – drums on "Mary Lost a Ring"
Production
Don McLean – producer
Pat Severs – producer, engineering, mastering
Mike Severs – producer, engineering, mastering
Phyllis Arnett Dumond – art direction
Keith Perry – CD disc photo
Patrisha McLean – back booklet photo

Release history

References

Don McLean albums
2009 albums